Cracovia Soccer Club is a soccer team based in Beechboro, Western Australia, and is the footballing arm of the Cracovia Club, a Polish Australian community organisation.

History
The club was formed in 1950 at St Brigid's Parish Hall by members of the Perth Polish Australian community. The club was named Polish Sport Club Cracovia after the city of Kraków in Poland. It is a name shared by Polish team Cracovia. The club was initially based in Perth before moving to premises in Barlee Street, Highgate in 1972. The club was based in Highgate until 1990 when it moved to its current location in Beechboro.

Success
In 1965, after a number of seasons in the lower divisions of the Western Australia State League, Cracovia with the assistance of the Polish Olympic Committee recruited a number of seasoned Polish footballers including Władysław Musiał, Paweł Sobek, Zygmunt Pieda and Henryk Lukoszek. Success was immediate with Cracovia winning the first division in 1965 and the State League in 1966.

Decline
After a decade near the top of the State League Cracovia were relegated in 1974. From that point the club's success was limited to brief spells in the top flight before leaving the semi-professional competition in the mid-90s to compete in the state amateur competition.

During the early 1980s Bobby Moore played one match as a guest for Cracovia.

Due to regulations of the state soccer federation the club was known as Beechboro White Eagles in the 1990s.

Current
As of 2022, the club plays in the Amateur League Division 3.

References

Soccer clubs in Perth, Western Australia
Association football clubs established in 1955
1955 establishments in Australia
Polish sports clubs in Australia
Polish association football clubs outside Poland